"Glamour Girl" is a song written and recorded by Belgian acid house musician Praga Khan. It was featured on Freakazoids.

Track listing
Belgian CD Single
 "Glamour Girl (Album Version)" - 3:19	
 "Glamour Girl (Plastic People Mix)" - 4:15

Belgian Antler-Subway 12" Single
 "Plastic People (Extended Mix)" - 6:04	
 "Glamour Girl (Filterheadz Vocal Mix)" - 7:34	
 "Glamour Girl (Extended Album Version)" - 5:24	
 "Glamour Girl (Sam vs. Philip @ Little Major Mix)" - 7:14

Belgian Fingerlicking Good 12" Single
 "Glamour Girl (Plastic People Mix)" - 4:15
 "Glamour Girl (Sam Hell vs. Philip Remix)" - 7:14	
 "Glamour Girl (Zzino vs. Filterheadz Remix)" - 7:37	
 "Glamour Girl (Trish van Eynde Remix)" - 7:02

European CD Single
 "Glamour Girl (Album Version)" - 3:19
 "Glamour Girl (Plastic People Mix)" - 4:15	
 "Glamour Girl (Plastic People Extended Mix)" - 6:04	
 "Glamour Girl (Filterheadz Vocal Mix)" - 7:34	
 "Glamour Girl (extended Album Version)" - 5:24	
 "Glamour Girl (Sam vs. Philip @ Little Major Mix)" - 7:14

US 12" Single
 "Glamour Girl (Original Mix)" - 3:19
 "Glamour Girl (Plastic People Mix)" - 4:15
 "Glamour Girl (Trish van Eynde Remix)" - 7:02
 "Glamour Girl (Zzino vs. Filterheadz Remix)" - 7:37
 "Glamour Girl (Filterheadz Dub)"

References

2002 singles
2002 songs
Praga Khan songs